Hardinge is a surname. People with the surname include:

Viscount Hardinge, UK peerage, including:
Henry Hardinge, 1st Viscount Hardinge (1785–1856), British Army field marshal, Governor-General of India
Charles Hardinge, 2nd Viscount Hardinge (1822–1894), British politician
Baron Hardinge of Penshurst, UK peerage, including:
Charles Hardinge, 1st Baron Hardinge of Penshurst (1858–1944), British diplomat and statesman, Viceroy of India
Alexander Hardinge, 2nd Baron Hardinge of Penshurst (1894–1960), British Army officer and courtier
Sir Arthur Edward Hardinge (1828–1892), British Army general, Governor of Gibraltar
Sir Arthur Henry Hardinge (1859–1933), British diplomat
Frances Hardinge (born 1973), British author
George Hardinge (1743–1816), English judge and Member of Parliament
George Nicholas Hardinge (1781–1808), Royal Navy officer
Nicholas Hardinge (1699–1758), English civil servant, Member of Parliament, known also as a neo-Latin poet
Richard Hardinge (c.1593–1658), English parliamentarian and courtier
Sarah Ann Lillie Hardinge (1824-1913), Texas artist
Wally Hardinge (1886–1965), English cricketer
William Money Hardinge (1854–1916), English poet and author

See also
Harding (surname)